This is a list of Baptist colleges and universities in the United Kingdom:
Bristol Baptist College
Irish Baptist College
Northern Baptist College
North Wales Baptist College
Regent's Park College, Oxford
Scottish Baptist College
South Wales Baptist College
Spurgeon's Baptist College

References

 United Kingdom
 List
Baptist colleges and universities
Baptist colleges and universities
Colleges and universities in the United Kingdom